The 2001 Pittsburgh Panthers football team represented the University of Pittsburgh in the 2001 NCAA Division I-A football season.

Schedule

Roster

Coaching staff

Team players drafted into the NFL

Notes 

 The December 1 game against UAB was a makeup of games that were postponed due to the 9/11 terror attacks cancelling all major sporting events for one week.

References

Pittsburgh
Pittsburgh Panthers football seasons
Cheez-It Bowl champion seasons
Pittsburgh Panthers football